Cudgera Creek is a town located in north-eastern New South Wales, Australia, in the Tweed Shire.

Demographics

The median age of the Cudgera Creek population was 36 years, 1 year below the national median of 37.

87.6% of people living in Cudgera Creek were born in Australia. The other top responses for country of birth were New Zealand 1.8%, England 1.6%, Italy 1%, Thailand 1%, Sweden 0.8%.

94.8% of people spoke only English at home; the next most common language was 0.8% Vietnamese.

References 

Suburbs of Tweed Heads, New South Wales